The Ordway Center for the Performing Arts, in downtown Saint Paul, Minnesota, hosts a variety of performing arts, such as touring Broadway musicals, orchestra, opera, and cultural performers, and produces local musicals. It is home to several local arts organizations, including the Minnesota Opera, The Saint Paul Chamber Orchestra, and The Schubert Club. The president and CEO, Christopher Harrington, has served since November 2021, and Producing Artistic Director Rod Kaats has been with the Ordway since February 2018.

History

In 1980, Saint Paul resident Sally Ordway Irvine (a 3M heiress and arts patron) dreamed of a European-style concert hall offering "everything from opera to the Russian circus". She contributed $7.5 million—a sum matched by other members of the Ordway family—toward the facility's cost. Fifteen Twin Cities corporations and foundations were the principal funders of the $46 million complex, the most expensive privately funded arts facility ever built in the state. Saint Paul native Benjamin Thompson, whose other projects included the Faneuil Hall renovation in Boston and South Street Seaport in New York, was selected to design a building that would project "a visible contemporary image" but also harmoniously fit on a site facing Rice Park, a block-square park framed by historic buildings. As designed by Thompson, Ordway Center (originally named Ordway Music Theatre) contained a 1,900-seat Music Theater; an intimate McKnight Theatre (306 seats); two large rehearsal rooms; and the Marzitelli Foyer, a spacious two-story lobby with a glass curtain-wall through which theatergoers enjoy a sweeping panorama of Rice Park, its surrounding buildings, and, in the distance, the Mississippi River. The McKnight Theatre was demolished in 2013 to make room for the new 1,093-seat Concert Hall, which opened on February 28, 2015.

The Ordway Center opened to the public on January 1, 1985, as Ordway Music Theatre. The name was changed in 2000 to reflect the array of performing arts that take place under its roof.

Ordway Center for the Performing Arts serves 400,000 people annually with nearly 500 performances in musical theater, children's theater, world music and dance, orchestra, opera, and recitals.

About the building
Ordway Center contains the 1,910-seat Music Theater, the 1,100-seat Concert Hall, two large rehearsal halls, and lobbies on each floor, including the second-floor Marzitelli Foyer, a spacious, two-story lobby encircled by a glass facade.

Interior

Exterior

References

External links
Ordway Center for the Performing Arts

Arts organizations based in Saint Paul, Minnesota
Minneapolis–Saint Paul
Music venues in Minnesota
Theatres in Minnesota
Buildings and structures in Saint Paul, Minnesota
Culture of Saint Paul, Minnesota
Performing arts centers in Minnesota
Theatres completed in 1985
1985 establishments in Minnesota